Malcolm Davenport Milne  (1915–1991) was an English physician and nephrologist.

Biography
After education at Stockport School, Milne matriculated at the University of Manchester, where he graduated BSc in 1936 and MB ChB (Manch.) in 1939. During WWII he was a regimental medical officer. From 1940 to 1946 he served in a field ambulance with the 8th Army in North Africa and then Italy. In 1943 for his service in Tunisia he was mentioned in dispatches.

He qualified MRCP in 1947 and graduated MD in 1951.

From 1952 to 1961 Milne worked at the Royal Postgraduate Medical School.

In 1961 Milne was appointed to the chair of medicine at the Westminster Hospital Medical School, where he retired in 1981. There he was a clinician and teacher and continued his research on metabolic disorders. He was an internationally recognized authority on disorders of amino-acid transport.

In 1941 in Stockport, Cheshire he married Mary Thorpe. They became the parents of a son and a daughter.

Awards and honours
 1958 — FRCP
 1963 — Bradshaw Lecturer on Disorders of amino-acid transport
 1976 — Lumleian Lecturer on Transport defects in disease
 1978 — FRS
 1981 — Baly Medal

Selected publications

References

1915 births
1991 deaths
20th-century English medical doctors
Alumni of the University of Manchester
Physicians of the Westminster Hospital
Fellows of the Royal College of Physicians
Fellows of the Royal Society
Royal Army Medical Corps officers